Buddleja axillaris is a shrub endemic to Madagascar, the Comoro Islands, and Tanzania, growing in forests at elevations of 300–1400 m. The species was first named and described by Willdenow in 1827.

Description
Buddleja axillaris is a sarmentose shrub 2–3 m in height, with quadrangular branchlets, often obscurely winged, and white-pubescent. The opposite leaves have thinly coriaceous ovate to narrowly elliptic blades, 6–30 cm long by 2–10 cm wide, acuminate or apiculate, abruptly narrowed at the base, minutely pilose above, but white-tomentose to subglabrous beneath, with mostly shallow crenate - dentate margins. The slender white or occasionally yellow inflorescences are axillary, solitary and thyrsoid 3–14 cm long by 1–4 cm wide, the corollas 5–17 mm long.

The species is considered closely related to B. cuspidata and B. sphaerocalyx.

Cultivation
Buddleja axillaris is not common in cultivation.
Hardiness: USDA zone 10.

References

acuminata
Flora of Madagascar
Flora of the Comoros
Flora of Tanzania